Johanna Jacoba (Johnny) Rolf (born 30 September 1936, in The Hague) is a Dutch ceramist, drawing artist and sculptor.

Life and work 
Rolf was educated into the pottery profession by Jan de Rooden, with whom she started a studio in 1958 and married. One of her students was the Dutch ceramist Mariet Schmidt, born in Schiedam in 1935.

In 1962 Rolf took part of an exhibition of six young ceramists from Amsterdam in Museum Boijmans Van Beuningen, together with Hans de Jong, Sonja Landweer, Johan van Loon, Jan de Rooden and Jan van der Vaart, which signified the rebirth of artisan ceramics in the Netherlands. In 1966 she was visiting designer at the Gustavsberg porcelain factory in Zweden.

In 1964	she and Jan de Rooden were awarded the "Contour Prijs" by De Koninklijke Porceleyne Fles in Delft.

Works in public collections 
 Gemeentemuseum Den Haag
 Princessehof Ceramics Museum
 Stedelijk Museum Amsterdam

See also 
 List of Dutch ceramists

References

Further reading 
 J.W.N. van Achterbergh, 'Inleiding tot het werk van Johnny Rolf en haar man Jan de Rooden', Mededelingenblad Vrienden van de Nederlandse Ceramiek nr. 2, 1964, p. 32-51
 R. Driessen, 'Keramiek als levenswerk. Een gesprek met Johnny Rolf en Jan de Rooden', Vormen uit vuur nr. 197, 2007, p. 24-34

External links 

  Johnny Rolf en Jan de Rooden website
  Rolf, Johnny at capriolus.nl

1936 births
Living people
Dutch ceramists
Artists from The Hague